Azot Severodonetsk is a bandy club based in Sievierodonetsk, Ukraine. It plays its homegames at Sievierodonetsk city stadium. The club colour is orange.

Azot Severodonetsk won the Ukrainian championship in 2012. This was the first Ukrainian bandy final since Ukraine became independent in 1991.

Sources

Bandy clubs in Ukraine
Sport in Sievierodonetsk